Yvan Mendy (born 21 May 1985) is a French professional boxer of Senegalese descent. He has held multiple regional lightweight titles throughout his career, including the French title from 2013 to 2014; the European Union title in 2016; and the WBC Silver title in 2017.

Professional career
In June 2013, a year after unsuccessfully taking on Viktor Postol for the WBC International Silver super lightweight title, Mendy won the French lightweight title for the first time, beating Marvin Petit. He went on to defend this title four times before trying to become European champion.

In April 2015 Mendy fought Edis Tatli for the vacant EBU (European) lightweight title and was defeated by unanimous decision.

On December 12, 2015 Mendy recorded a split-decision victory over Olympic gold medalist Luke Campbell on the undercard of Anthony Joshua vs. Dillian Whyte.

Professional boxing record

References

1985 births
Living people
French male boxers
Boxers from Paris
French sportspeople of Senegalese descent
Lightweight boxers